Prymas – trzy lata z tysiąca (Primate – three years in a thousand) is a Polish historical film. It was released in 2000.

References

External links
 

2000 films
Polish historical films
2000s Polish-language films
2000s historical films